Eastern Angles is a professional rural touring theatre company based in Ipswich. The company specialises in touring new writing across the East of England to theatres, village halls, community venues in Suffolk, Norfolk, Essex and Cambridgeshire. Eastern Angles has been running since 1982 and have also toured shows to Edinburgh Festival Fringe. The Artistic Director is Ivan Cutting.

History 
Eastern Angles was established in 1982 by Ivan Cutting, Pat Whymark, David Caddick, Lawrence Werber and Jan Farmery. The theatre company's work focuses on new writing and themes of place and heritage. Ivan Cutting is the Artistic Director of the company.

Eastern Angles toured its first show, Marsh Fever, in April to June 1982 in Suffolk. Since then, the company have been running for over 30 years and extended its work to venues in Norfolk, Essex and Cambridgeshire. Some of Eastern Angles' work has toured to London venues including I Caught Crabs in Walberswick at the Bush Theatre in 2008, I Heart Peterborough played at the Soho Theatre in 2012 and The Long Life & Good Fortune of John Clare at The Pleasance in Islington. They tour work to Edinburgh Festival Fringe, most recently with Chicken in 2015 at Summerhall in Paines Plough's Roundabout venue.

As well as performing at established theatres, the company is known for transforming non-conventional places into performance spaces including fire stations, garden centres, airfields, aircraft hangars and farmyard barns.

Since the 1980s, Eastern Angles have based themselves at the Sir John Mills Theatre in Ipswich. In 2008, the company set up a second base in Peterborough and are currently based at Chauffeur's Cottage in the centre of the city. Eastern Angles also own a theatre space in Peterborough known as The Undercroft at Serpentine Green Shopping Centre.

Eastern Angles is funded by Arts Council England. The company is a National Portfolio Organisation and has secured funding until 2022.

Notable actors and creatives that have worked with the company include Alistair McGowen in Goodbye America in 1990, Arthur Darvill as composer for I Heart Peterborough in 2012 and writer Molly Davies for Chicken in 2015, the first female winner of the Pinter Commission at the Royal Court Theatre. Eastern Angles' patron is Monty Python collaborator, Neil Innes.

Productions 
1980s:
 Marsh Fever
 Vital Statistics
 When the Boats Came In
 No Song No Supper
 Barters Green
 Marsh Fever (revised)
 The Reapers Year
 Natural Causes
 Devil on the Heath
 On the Home Front
 Medieval Miracle
 Tale of the Turf
 John Barleycorn
 Moll Flanders
 Mr Pickwick's Victorian Christmas
 Waterland
 Shout!
 Mr Pickwick Goes to Town
1990s:
 Peddars Way 
 Goodbye America
 Sherlock Holmes & The Missing Carol
 The Way We Live Now
 Waterland
 Phileas Fogg's Great Eastern Gallivant
 Peculiar People
 Song of Provence
 When The Boats Came In (Revival)
 Father Brown 
 Hereward: The First English Rebel 
 Beneath the Waves
 Inheritance 
 Lord Peter Wimsey & The Bergholt Bells 
 A Bad Case of Love
 The Sutton Hoo Mob
 Kid
 Sherlock Holmes & The Mummy's Tomb
 David Copperfield
 The Reapers Year (Revival)
 Sexton Blake & The Orford Oysters
 Blending In
 Fields
 Pirates of Pin Mill
 No Name
 The Wuffings
 The Ghost of the Old Rep
 A Warning to the Curious
 The Bluethroat
 Ferry Across The Waveney
 Message from Neptune
 Days of Plenty
 Joans Quick and the Temple of Time
2000s:
 Margaret Catchpole
 In the Bleak Midwinter 
 Timelords of Tacket Street
 Tithe War!
 Crossroad Blues
 Parson Combs & The Ballad of Mad Dog Creek
 The Walsingham Organ
 Boudicca's Babes
 East Anglian Psychos
 Bats Over Bleedham Market
 The Last Laugh
 Bone Harvest
 David Copperfield (National Revival)
 Doubloon!
 Edge of the Land
 Margaret Down Under
 Another Three Sisters
 Masters of Mayhem
 A Dulditch Angel
 Beyond the Breakers
 The Day the Earth Wobbled a Bit!
 The Anatomist
 The Sutton Hoo Mob (Revival)
 Birds Without Wings
 East Anglian Psychos (Revival)
 Blood Beast Horror
 Truckstop
 Peapickers
 Crampons of Fear!
 I Caught Crabs in Walberswick
 Cuckoo Teapot
 Tiata Delights
 We Didn't Mean to Go to Sea
 The Haunted Commode
 Egusi Soup
 Return to Akenfield
 The Lion & Unicorn
 Lincoln Road
 Getting Here
 Masnfield Park & Ride
2010s:
 Palm Wine & Stout
 The Long Way Home
 Tales from the Middle of Town
 Bentwater Roads
 Our Nobby
 Gills Around The Green
 Up Out O'The Sea
 Crossed Keys
 Round the Twist!
 Private Resistance
 Margaret Catchpole
 I Heart Peterborough
 The Long Life & Great Good Fortune of John Clare
 Dial M for Murgatroyd
 Dark Earth
 Parkway Dreams
 The Brontes of Dunwich Heath (& Cliff)
 Once Upon A Lifetime
 Palm Wine & Stout (Revival Tour)
 Ragnarök
 River Lane
 The Mystery of St Finnigan's Elbow
 Oysters
 Sid & Hettie
 Mary and the Midwives
 Chicken
 Parkway Dreams (Revival Tour)
 Nativity Blues
 Holy Mackerel!
 Somewhere in England
 Red Skies
 We Didn't Mean To Go To Sea (Revival Tour)
 Future Floodlands
 Ground
 The (Fletton) Railway Children
 Stoat Hall
 The Strange Undoing of Prudencia Hart
 The Trials of Mary
 The Ladykillers of Humber Doucy Lane

References

External links 
 Official Website

Theatre companies in England
Culture in Suffolk